The term plagiarism may refer to:

 Plagiarism, as immoral appropriation in academia, journalism or the arts
 Plagiarism (album), a 1997 recording by the band Sparks
 Plagiarism (EP), a six-track EP of covers by The Dillinger Escape Plan
Plagiarism, a 2020 album by Yorushika